Daddy Rockin' Strong: A Tribute to Nolan Strong & the Diablos is a vinyl-only tribute album released by The Wind Records and distributed by Norton Records. On January 21, 2013, Burger Records re-issued the compilation on cassette tape.

It features 13 Nolan Strong covers by various rock and roll, punk and garage bands, including the Dirtbombs, Reigning Sound, Mark Sultan, Wreckless Eric & Amy Rigby, Outrageous Cherry, the Hentchmen, Cub Koda, Andre Williams, and Lenny Kaye, among others. 

The record was compiled in memory of Strong, a Detroit-based R&B singer known for his high tenor voice that influenced a young Smokey Robinson. Strong, who signed to Fortune Records in 1954, was a pre-Motown sensation. He is best known for his hit songs "The Wind" and "Mind Over Matter". He died in 1977 and is buried in Detroit. Because Fortune Records ceased operations in the mid-1980s, Strong's music has remained out of print since then.

Reception
The tribute album received positive reviews from a number of publications, including published reviews from Uncut Magazine and Razorcake. All Music Guide hailed the compilation as "one of the best tribute albums of recent memory." . The Los Angeles Times noted, "each cut is a tender love ballad to an overlooked legend."

Track listing
"The Wind" - Mark Sultan 
"Daddy Rockin' Strong" - The Dirtbombs
"You're the Only Girl, Delores" - Cub Koda 
"Yeah, Baby (It's Because of You)" - Outrageous Cherry
"The Way You Dog Me Around" - Andre Williams & the A-Bones 
"Do You Remember What You Did" - Danny Kroha & the Del Torros
"Mind Over Matter" - Reigning Sound 
"I Want to Be Your Happiness" - Wreckless Eric & Amy Rigby
"Real True Love" - The A-Bones 
"Mambo of Love" - The Hentchmen
"Try Me One More Time" - Demon's Claws
"Harriett, It's You" - Gentleman Jesse & His Men
"I Wanna Know" - Lenny Kaye

References
 Los Angeles Times: LA Times Nolan Strong tribute story
 All Music Guide: AMG Review by Mark Demming

External links
 Norton Records store: Tribute LP is available from Norton Records
'The Wind Records: Official Site for The Wind Records

Tribute albums
2010 compilation albums
Rock compilation albums